Giorgos Fountas (February  13, 1922 – November 28, 2010) was a Greek actor in film and television.

Biography
Fountas attended the Dramatic School at the Athens Odeum. He appeared for the first time in the theatre in Nyfiatiko tragoudi ("Bridal Song") and his first film in 1944.  He was awarded at the  Thessaloniki Film Festival in 1966 and 1967 for his participation in his films With the Shine in the Eyes and Fever on the Road.

He remained popular and he is best remembered for his role in the movie Stella with Melina Mercouri where he pronounced one quote, which was satirized in the movie Straight Story in 2006.

He also appeared on several TV roles.

Filmography

Films

Television

Awards

References

External links

Giorgos fountas at cine.gr 
Sources from the movie Red Lights, at the Film Library of Greece  

1924 births
2010 deaths
People from Kallieis
Greek male television actors
Greek male film actors
Deaths from dementia in Greece
Deaths from Alzheimer's disease